Alqueidão da Serra is a civil parish in the municipality of Porto de Mós, Portugal. The population in 2021 was 1,549, in an area of 21.27 km2.

It features a 100m long Roman road which was built between the 1st century BC and the 1st century AD.

References 

Parishes of Porto de Mós